Bogdan Ionuţ Pereş (born 4 July 1983) is a former football player who last time played for FC Baia Mare as a striker.

He played as a youngster at FC Baia Mare, where he made his debut in the Romanian Liga II in 1998. He played for FC Baia Mare between 1998 and 2004, then he moved in 2004 at Gloria Bistriţa, where he played two years. He moved to FC Brașov and after some time he returned at FC Baia Mare. After a short spell at FC Baia Mare, he played first-team football at Arieşul Turda in Liga II. He returned at FC Baia Mare in the summer of 2009, where he played for one more season before retiring from professional football

References

Interview with Bogdan Pereş

External links
 
 

1983 births
Living people
Sportspeople from Baia Mare
Romanian footballers
Association football forwards
Liga I players
Liga II players
CS Minaur Baia Mare (football) players
ACF Gloria Bistrița players
FC Brașov (1936) players
ACS Sticla Arieșul Turda players